Emneth was a railway station, near Wisbech, which served the village of Emneth, Norfolk.  The station was opened in 1848 as an extension of the East Anglian Railway's line from Magdalen Road station (now known as Watlington) to Wisbech East. In 1872 Elizabeth Pearce, twelve year-old daughter of a nearby crossing keeper, drowned in the 'Tea-water pit'.  The station's location, like that of the neighbouring Middle Drove station, was fairly rural and the line eventually closed in 1968. In October 1942, a hoard of Roman silver coins together with fragments of an urn in which they were stored was found near the station. Emneth's station building survived closure, and has since been converted into a private residence.

References

Disused railway stations in Norfolk
Former Great Eastern Railway stations
Railway stations in Great Britain opened in 1848
Railway stations in Great Britain closed in 1968
King's Lynn and West Norfolk